Ghetto refers to a portion of a municipality in which a particular ethnic or racial group lives, often in poor conditions.

Ghetto or The Ghetto may also refer to:

Songs
"Ghetto" (Akon song), 2004
"Ghetto" (Kelly Rowland song), 2007
"Ghetto", by August Alsina from Testimony, 2014
"Ghetto", by Delaney & Bonnie from The Original Delaney & Bonnie & Friends"Ghetto", by Junai Kaden featuring Mumzy Stranger, 2011
"Ghetto", by P.O.D. from Satellite"Ghetto", by Samra, 2019
"The Ghetto" (Donny Hathaway song), 1969
"The Ghetto" (Too Short song), 1990

Other uses
Ghetto (play), a 1984 play by Joshua Sobol, about the Vilna ghetto in World War II
Ghetto (rapper), now known as Ghetts, British rapperGhetto'', a 1997 documentary film by Thomas Imbach

See also
 Gay ghetto or gay village
 Pink ghetto, a term used to refer to jobs dominated by women
 Student ghetto, or student quarter
 University of Dayton Ghetto